Guillaume d’Abbes de Cabrebolles, also Guillaume d’Abbes, baron de Cabreroles, (21 March 1718, Bédarieux – 1 October 1802, Saint-Martin-d’Aumes) was an 18th-century French lawyer, and Encyclopédiste
during the Age of Enlightenment.

Biography 
Abbes came from an Occitan family of judges. His father was Guillaume Abbes, seigneur de Courbeson (born 1679), his mother Elisabeth de Valery, married since 1717.

On 11 February 1741, Guillaume d’Abbes de Cabrebolles married Marie Jeanne Aphrodise de Gineste in Béziers with whom he had a daughter, Marie Claire Aphrodise d’Abbes de Cabrebolles. Admitted to the bar in 1741, he practised in this capacity from 1749 to 1789 and worked as correcteur à la chambre des comptes de Montpellier.

He wrote the article Physiologie for the Encyclopédie by Diderot and d’Alembert.

Works (selection) 
1745: Relation des inondations arrivées à la ville de Bédarieux en 1745. Reprint (1838)
1758: Voyage dans les espaces imaginaires. London,

References

External links 
Abbes de Cabrebolles on Persée
 Frank A. Kafker: Notices sur les auteurs des dix-sept volumes de « discours » de l'Encyclopédie. Recherches sur Diderot et sur l'Encyclopédie, year 1989, Volume 7, issue 7, (p. 126)
Abbes de Cabrebolles on Wikisource

18th-century French lawyers
18th-century French writers
18th-century French male writers
Contributors to the Encyclopédie (1751–1772)
People from Bédarieux
1718 births
1802 deaths